The Polish Beer-Lovers' Party (PPPP) was a satirical Polish political party that was founded in 1990 by satirist Janusz Rewiński. Originally, the party's goal was to promote cultural beer-drinking in English-style pubs instead of vodka and thus fight alcoholism.

The humorous name and disillusionment with Poland's political transformation led some Poles to vote for the party. The nature of the party's appeal to its supporters was reflected in frequently-heard remarks that maybe with the PPPP at the helm "it wouldn't be better but for sure it would be funnier".

Although it may have started as a prank, with time, its members developed a serious platform. Moreover, the idea of a political discussion in establishments that served quality beer became a symbol of freedom of association and expression, intellectual tolerance, and a higher standard of living.

In the 1991 parliamentary elections the PPPP won 16 seats in the Sejm capturing 2.97% of the vote. The party soon split into Large Beer and Small Beer factions, despite Rewiński's claims that "beer is neither light nor dark, it is tasty". Eventually the PPPP was dissolved, in 1993.

The Large Beer faction assumed the name Polish Economic Program. Losing its image of quirkiness, the Polish Economic Program became associated with the Democratic Union (UD). The Little Beer faction became associated with  the Liberal Democratic Congress in a Coalition of liberal promarket parties, which supported the candidacy of Hanna Suchocka as prime minister.

See also

Beer Lovers Party (Russia)
List of political parties in Poland
List of frivolous parties

References

Political parties established in 1990
Defunct political parties in Poland
Poland
Beer political parties
1990 establishments in Poland
Joke political parties in Poland